High Desert State Prison (HDSP) is a high-security state prison that houses level IV inmates located in Leavitt, Lassen County, California. Opened in 1995, it has a capacity of 2,324 persons.

As of July 31, 2022, High Desert was incarcerating people at 78.4% of its design capacity, with 1,823 occupants.

Also located in Lassen County is the state California Correctional Center, a minimum-security prison. A third prison facility, the Federal Correctional Institution, Herlong, is also located within Lassen County, California. Half the adult population of nearby Susanville works at these prisons. The prisons and their effects on the community, including as a source of much needed jobs, were explored in the documentary, Prison Town, USA (2007), aired on PBS.

Investigation

In late 2015 the state Office of the Inspector General completed a six-month investigation into conditions at the prison, after complaints of officer misconduct and prisoner abuse, and issued its report, calling for changes at the facility. Although there are buildings to house certain inmates in protective custody, such as sex offenders, officers put other prisoners near them. The prison has had a rapid turnover in top management for nearly a decade, with seven wardens in eight years. In their report investigators wrote there was a "perception of insularity and indifference to inmates" at High Desert, exacerbated by its remoteness and "a labor organization that opposes oversight to the point of actively discouraging members from coming forward with information that could … adversely affect another officer."

Notable inmates 
 Ronnie Radke, former Escape the Fate singer, convicted of being an accessory in the murder of an 18-year-old in 2006. When he was released from prison in December 2010, he formed a new band called Falling in Reverse
 Terry Peder Rasmussen, serial killer, died in the prison in 2010
 Joe Son, actor in Austin Powers and convicted rapist
 Joseph Fiorella, one of the rapists and murderers of Elyse Pahler

References

External links
 California Department of Corrections and Rehabilitation Official website
  Special Review: High Desert State Prison/ Susanville, CA, at Prison Legal News, December 2015, full text of Office of the Inspector General report online

1995 establishments in California
Buildings and structures in Lassen County, California
Prisons in California